Gim Alji(Kim Alti) (金閼智; 65–?) was a historical figure in Korean history. His descendants formed the Gim royal clan of Silla, one of the Three Kingdoms of Korea.

His legendary birth is said to have occurred during the reign of Silla's fourth ruler, King Talhae of Silla. Though Gim Alji did not rule as King of Silla, his descendants did. Today, 1.7 million South Koreans are in the Gyeongju Gim clan, who trace their genealogy to Gim Alji.

Birth legend

The Samguk Yusa and Samguk Sagi both contain nearly the same story about Gim Alji's birth.

In the year 65 (9th year of Talhae's reign), King Talhae heard a rooster crowing in Sirim, west of Geumseong (Gyeongju, the Silla capital at the time).  He sent his minister, Hogong, who was from Japan, to investigate, whereupon Hogong found a golden box hanging on a branch. Light was emanating from the box, and a white rooster was crowing under it.

Hearing this report, the king ordered the box brought to him.  When the king opened the box, there was an infant inside. The king was very pleased and adopted him. Because he was born from a golden box and was very clever, the king named him  "Gim (金, meaning gold) Alji(Alti) (meaning 'gold' in native Korean, with the hanja 閼智 supposed to be read phonetically)". The forest where the box was found was named Gyerim (rooster forest), which also was used as the name of Silla. This legend is similar to the birth legend of the founder of Silla, Bak Hyeokgeose of Silla (who is said to have called himself Alji Geoseogan). Many scholars have suggested that the Gim Alji(Alti) may have been the chief of a "gold" (altin) clan of northern Korea/Manchuria.

Death
The circumstances and time of his death are currently unknown and cannot be precisely located within any records, but it is known that his descendants continued to serve as powerful officials within the Silla court until the time came when they took power.

Royal Gim clan
Gim's son was Sehan (세한(勢漢)), and subsequent generations are recorded as: Ado (아도(阿都)) - Suryu (수류(首留)) - Ukbo (욱보(郁甫)) - Gudo (구도(俱道)). Gudo's son (Gim Alji's seventh generation descendant) was the first Silla king of the Gim line, Michu of Silla.

See also
Michu of Silla
Gyeongju Gim

Sources

 三國史記 

Silla people
Gim clan of Gyeongju
1st-century Korean people
65 births